2010 in philosophy

Events 
 Philosophy research centre and postgraduate programmes in Middlesex University relocate to Kingston University after a decision to close taught programmes and subsequent campaign to save them.

Publications 
 Kwame Anthony Appiah, The Honor Code: How Moral Revolutions Happen (2010)
 Anthony Kenny, A New History of Western Philosophy (2010)
 Bruno Latour, Coming out as a philosopher (2008 lecture for the reception of the Siegfried Unseld Preis, published in essay form in 2010) 
 Magus Magnus, Heraclitean Pride (2010)
 Konrad Ott, Umweltethik zur Einführung (German, not yet translated into English) (2010)
 John Searle, Making the Social World: The Structure of Human Civilization (2010)
 Christian Smith, What Is a Person? (2010)
 Julian Young, Friedrich Nietzsche: A Philosophical Biography (2010)

Deaths 
 May 22 - Martin Gardner (born 1914)
 October 3 - Philippa Foot (born 1920)

References 

Philosophy
21st-century philosophy
Philosophy by year